Kleanthis Ierissiotis (born 14 March 1953) is a Greek athlete. He competed in the men's hammer throw at the 1976 Summer Olympics.

References

1953 births
Living people
Athletes (track and field) at the 1976 Summer Olympics
Greek male hammer throwers
Olympic athletes of Greece
Athletes from Thessaloniki
20th-century Greek people